Luca Sportelli (11 March 1927 - 29 August 1999) was an Italian actor who appeared in more than one hundred films from 1964 to 1991.

Selected filmography

References

External links 

1927 births
1999 deaths
Italian male film actors